Energy flux is the rate of transfer of energy through a surface. The quantity is defined in two different ways, depending on the context:
 Total rate of energy transfer (not per unit area); SI units: W = J⋅s−1.
 Specific rate of energy transfer (total normalized per unit area);  SI units: W⋅m−2 = J⋅m−2⋅s−1:
 This is a vector quantity, its components being determined in terms of the normal (perpendicular)  direction to the surface of measurement.
 This is sometimes called energy flux density, to distinguish it from the first definition.
 Radiative flux, heat flux, and sound energy flux are specific cases of this meaning.

See also
Energy flow (ecology)
Flux
Irradiance
Poynting vector
Stress–energy tensor
Energy current

References

Physical quantities
Vector calculus